"I'm Just Too Shy" is a song recorded by American R&B singer Jermaine Jackson, a former member of The Jackson 5. It was released as the first single from his 1981 album, I Like Your Style, in September of that year.

Record World said that "Jackson's fragile falsetto skips
lightly over q delicate, mid-tempo rhythm while high harmonies carry the hook."

Charts

References

Jermaine Jackson songs
1981 singles
Songs written by Jermaine Jackson